In geometry, the truncated tetrahexagonal tiling is a semiregular tiling of the hyperbolic plane. There are one square, one octagon, and one dodecagon on each vertex.  It has Schläfli symbol of tr{6,4}.

Dual tiling

Related polyhedra and tilings 

From a Wythoff construction there are fourteen hyperbolic uniform tilings that can be based from the regular order-4 hexagonal tiling. 

Drawing the tiles colored as red on the original faces, yellow at the original vertices, and blue along the original edges, there are 7 forms with full [6,4] symmetry, and 7 with subsymmetry.

Symmetry

The dual of the tiling represents the fundamental domains of (*642) orbifold symmetry. From [6,4] symmetry, there are 15 small index subgroup by mirror removal and alternation operators. Mirrors can be removed if its branch orders are all even, and cuts neighboring branch orders in half. Removing two mirrors leaves a half-order gyration point where the removed mirrors met. In these images unique mirrors are colored red, green, and blue, and alternately colored triangles show the location of gyration points. The [6+,4+], (32×) subgroup has narrow lines representing glide reflections. The subgroup index-8 group, [1+,6,1+,4,1+] (3232) is the commutator subgroup of [6,4].

Larger subgroup constructed as [6,4*], removing the gyration points of [6,4+], (3*22), index 6 becomes (*3333), and [6*,4], removing the gyration points of [6+,4], (2*33), index 12 as (*222222). Finally their direct subgroups [6,4*]+, [6*,4]+, subgroup indices 12 and 24 respectively, can be given in orbifold notation as (3333) and (222222).

See also 

 Tilings of regular polygons
 List of uniform planar tilings

References
 John H. Conway, Heidi Burgiel, Chaim Goodman-Strass, The Symmetries of Things 2008,  (Chapter 19, The Hyperbolic Archimedean Tessellations)

External links 

 Hyperbolic and Spherical Tiling Gallery
 KaleidoTile 3: Educational software to create spherical, planar and hyperbolic tilings
 Hyperbolic Planar Tessellations, Don Hatch

Hyperbolic tilings
Isogonal tilings
Semiregular tilings
Truncated tilings